Schwinger variational principle is a variational principle which expresses the scattering T-matrix as a functional depending on two unknown wave functions. The functional attains stationary value equal to actual scattering T-matrix. The functional is stationary if and only if the two functions satisfy the Lippmann-Schwinger equation. The development of the variational formulation of the scattering theory can be traced to works of L. Hultén and J. Schwinger in 1940s.

Linear form of the functional
The T-matrix expressed in the form of stationary value of the functional reads

The condition for the stationary value of the functional is that the functions  and  satisfy the Lippmann-Schwinger equation

and

Fractional form of the functional
Different form of the stationary principle for T-matrix reads

The wave functions  and  must satisfy the same Lippmann-Schwinger equations to get the stationary value.

Application of the principle
The principle may be used for the calculation of the scattering amplitude in the similar way like the variational principle for bound states, i.e. the form of the wave functions  is guessed, with some free parameters, that are determined from the condition of stationarity of the functional.

See also
Lippmann-Schwinger equation
Quantum scattering theory
T-matrix
Green's operator

References

Bibliography

Scattering